Helston North is an electoral division of Cornwall in the United Kingdom and returns one member to sit on Cornwall Council. The current councillor is Mike Thomas, an Independent.

The current division is distinct from the division of the same name which existed from 2009 to 2013 and that from 2013 to 2021, which was abolished after redistricting at the 2021 local elections.

Councillors

2013-2021

2021-present

2021-present division

Extent
The present division covers the north and centre of the town of Helston, including Helston Community College and St Michael's primary school.

Election results

2021 election

2013-2021 division

Extent
Helston North covered the north of the town of Helston, including Helston Community College. The division was affected by boundary changes at the 2013 election. From 2009 to 2013, it covered 383 hectares in total; from 2013 to 2021 it covered 196 hectares.

Election results

2017 election

2013 election

2009 election

References

Helston
Electoral divisions of Cornwall Council